is the first extended play by Japanese pop singer Kyary Pamyu Pamyu. All of the tracks were produced by Nakata Yasutaka of Capsule. It was released on August 17, 2011, in two editions: a limited edition with a photobook and a regular edition. The lead single "PonPonPon" was released digitally on July 20, 2011. A second single, "Jelly", was released on August 3 and is a cover of the Capsule song of the same name.

Reception
Jun Yamamoto of hotexpress called the album "crazy, but cute", and highlighted "PonPonPon" and "Jelly" as the most notable songs.

Track listing

Personnel
Credits adapted from liner notes.
Yasutaka Nakata – written, arranged, produced, recorded, mixed, mastered
Steve Nakamura – art director
Shinji Konishi – hair, make-up
Eri Soyama – stylist

Charts

References

2011 debut EPs
Kyary Pamyu Pamyu albums
Japanese-language EPs
Warner Music Japan EPs
Unborde albums